Eastern Suburbs (now known as the Sydney Roosters) competed in the 10th New South Wales Rugby League(NSWRL) premiership in 1917.

Details

Results
Premiership Round 1, Saturday 12 May 1917,
Eastern Suburbs 10 defeated North Sydney 0 at the Agricultural Ground.

Premiership Round 2, Saturday 19 May 1917.
Glebe 5 ( Pert try, A. B. Burge goal ) defeated Eastern Suburbs 4 ( Messenger 2 goals ) at the Sydney Cricket Ground.

 "Had Glebe been penalised to the full extent for glaring Interference in the flrst half the result muy have been reversed. Wright, the Glebe three-quarter, was the delinquent, and the referee should have awarded Cubitt a penalty try for such a bad breach"  Sydney Morning Herald.

Premiership Round 3, Saturday 26 May 1917
Eastern Suburbs 9 ( Cubitt try; Messenger 3 Goals ) defeated South Sydney 6 ( Norman, Vaughan Tries ) at Agricultural Ground.

The result was said to be in doubt right up until the end
Premiership Round 4, Saturday 2 June 1917,
Newtown 11 defeated Eastern Suburbs 3 at the Sydney Cricket Ground.

Premiership Round 5, Tuesday 5 June 1917;
Balmain 13 defeated Eastern Suburbs 2 at the Sydney Cricket Ground.

Premiership Round 6, Saturday 9 June 1917; 
Western Suburbs 15 defeated Eastern Suburbs 2 at St Luke's Park.

Premiership Round 7, Saturday 16 June 1917;
Eastern Suburbs 14 defeated Annandale 9( J.Bain 3 tries) at the Agricultural Ground

Premiership Round 8, Saturday 23 June 1917;
Eastern Suburbs 16 defeated North Sydney 11(Deane, Emelhenz, Blinkhorn; Tries; Robetson Goal) at the Sydney Cricket Ground.

Premiership Round 9, Monday 25 June 1917;
Eastern Suburbs 14 beat Glebe 10 at the Agricultural Ground.

Premiership Round 10, Saturday 30 June 1917;
South Sydney 18( H. Horder, Moore, Vaughn Tries; Lucas 3 Goals) Defeated Eastern Suburbs 13 at the Sydney Sports Ground.

Premiership Round 11, Saturday 7 July 1917;
Newtown 12 beat Eastern Suburbs 11 at the Sydney Cricket Ground.

Premiership Round 12, Saturday 14 July 1917;
Balmain 18 defeated Eastern Suburbs 0 at the Sydney Cricket Ground.

Premiership Round 13, Saturday 21 July 1917;
Eastern Suburbs 14 beat Western Suburbs 9 at the Sydney Cricket Ground.

Premiership Round 14, Saturday 28 July 1917;
Eastern Suburbs 19 beat Annandale 8 at the Agricultural Ground.

Table

Glebe were stripped of two competition points due to fielding an ineligible player in one game.

Season Highlights
 Won the 3rd grade competition.

References

External links
Rugby League Tables and Statistics

Sydney Roosters seasons
East